Ebony Repertory Theatre (ERT) is a non-profit theatre company founded in June 2007 by Wren T. Brown
and the late Israel Hicks. ERT is the resident company and operator of the Nate Holden Performing Arts Center, a 400-seat regional theatre in Los Angeles, California's Mid-City community. ERT, whose award-winning theatre is its cornerstone, is the only African American professional theatre company (Actors Equity) in Los Angeles. ERT also presents a music series, a dance series, lecture series and other perennial programming. Under the leadership of Producing Artistic Director, Wren T. Brown, ERT "seeks to bring diverse, high standard, professional performing arts to the Mid-City community..." 

ERT is known for productions featuring performances by theatre, film and television actors, including Tony Award winners Roger Robinson, Ruben Santiago Hudson, L. Scott Caldwell, Leslie Odom Jr., Phylicia Rashad, Billy Porter and Garth Fagan, Emmy Award winners, Obba Babatunde, Blair Underwood, Keith David, Paula Kelly, Glynn Turman, Loretta Devine and Levar Burton, GRAMMY Award winners Dianne Reeves, Billy Childs, India Arie, Levar Burton and Blair Underwood, NEA Jazz Masters Award Winner Ahmad Jamal and Academy Award winner Ruth E. Carter.

ERT's mission is "To create, develop, nurture and sustain a world-class professional theatre rooted in the experience of the African diaspora." Its goal is "To build and expand a multicultural audience that contributes to the cultural understanding among people of diverse backgrounds."

Awards and nominations

References

External links 
 Ebony Repertory Theatre website 
 L.A. Stage Alliance / Ovation Awards 
 Nate Holden Performing Arts Center 

Theatres in Los Angeles
African-American organizations
African-American theatre
Theatre companies in Los Angeles
African-American culture